Christian-Democratic People's Party may refer to:
 Christian-Democratic People's Party (Moldova) (Partidul Popular Creştin-Democrat)
 Christian-Democratic People's Party (Romania) (Partidul Național Țărănesc Creștin Democrat), formerly the Christian-Democratic National Peasants' Party